World Series of Fighting 27: Future Champs was a mixed martial arts event held  in Memphis, Tennessee, United States. This event aired on NBCSN in the U.S. and on Fight Network in Canada.

Background
Number 2 ranked Light Heavyweight Teddy Holder faced off in the co-main event against WSOF newcomer Shamil Gamzatov.

Mike Ricci who was originally scheduled to face ONE Championship veteran Caros Fodor in the main event, but was replaced by Luiz Firmino due to an injury.

Results

See also 
 List of WSOF champions
 List of WSOF events

References

Events in Memphis, Tennessee
World Series of Fighting events
2016 in mixed martial arts
2016 in sports in Tennessee